Chago may refer to:
Chago, a common name for the plant Mirabilis expansa
Mathias Chago, Cameroonian-Croatian footballer